Sulemana Alijata (25 August 1975) is a former member of parliament for Sissala East in the Upper West region of Ghana.

Personal life 
Alijata is married (with children). She is a Muslim.

Early life and education 
Alijata was born on 25 August 1975 in Tumu in the Upper West region.

She earned her diploma in Community Development at the Rural Development College from 2005 to 2007.

Politics 
Alijata is a member of the National Democratic Congress.

She was a committee member on Gender and Children, Lands and Forestry.

Employment 
Alijata was in the Office of President.

She was the District Chief Executive of Sissala West District from 2008 to 2013.

She is a social worker.

She is a volunteer for the NGO People Action to Win Life All-round.

References 

1975 births
Living people
Ghanaian Muslims
National Democratic Congress (Ghana) politicians